Little Jaffna may refer to:
Wellawatte

See also 
Jaffna

Tamil diaspora